Kay Peak is a pyramidal peak,  high, near the end of the large spur descending northwest from the Mount Murphy massif, in Marie Byrd Land, Antarctica. It was mapped by the United States Geological Survey from surveys and U.S. Navy air photos, 1959–66, and was named by the Advisory Committee on Antarctic Names for Lieutenant Commander W. Kay, U.S. Navy, leader of the Construction Unit at South Pole Station during Operation Deep Freeze 1973.

References

Mountains of Marie Byrd Land